Water polo at the 2014 Asian Games was held in Dream Park Aquatics Center, Incheon, South Korea from 20 September to 1 October 2014.

Schedule

Medalists

Medal table

Draw 
A draw ceremony was held on 21 August 2014 to determine the groups for the men's competition. The teams were seeded based on their final ranking at the 2010 Asian Games. The women were played in round robin format.

Group A
 (1)
 (4)

Group B
 (2)
 (3)

Final standing

Men

Women

References

External links
Official website

 
2014 Asian Games events
2014
Asian Games
2014 Asian Games